Uğur Oğulcan Tezel (born 27 February 1997) is a Turkish-German professional footballer who plays as a right-back for FC Carl Zeiss Jena.

References

External links
 Profile at DFB.de
 
 Profile at kicker.de

1997 births
Living people
Footballers from Berlin
Turkish footballers
Turkey youth international footballers
German footballers
German people of Turkish descent
Association football fullbacks
Hertha BSC II players
SC Preußen Münster players
Berliner AK 07 players
FC Carl Zeiss Jena players
3. Liga players
Regionalliga players